Murder in Mississippi is a 1990 television film which dramatized the last weeks of civil rights activists Michael "Mickey" Schwerner, Andrew Goodman and James Chaney, and the events leading up to their disappearance and subsequent murder during Freedom Summer in 1964.  It starred Tom Hulce as Schwerner, Jennifer Grey as his wife Rita, Blair Underwood as Chaney, and Josh Charles as Goodman. Hulce received a nomination for Best Actor in a TV Miniseries at the 1990 Golden Globes.

As a historical docudrama, Murder in Mississippi precedes the storylines of both 1975's Attack on Terror: The FBI vs. the Ku Klux Klan and 1988's Mississippi Burning.

Murder in Mississippi is the title of a 1964 Norman Rockwell painting depicting the same events.  The painting is also known as Southern Justice.

Plot

In 1964, members of the Ku Klux Klan murdered three Civil Rights workers who had traveled to the South to encourage African-American voter registration. Examines the last three weeks in the lives of the slain activists.

Cast

In addition, Murder in Mississippi features an early role of Greg Kinnear, who was a television personality at the time; Kinnear appears at the end as a reporter - also named Greg Kinnear - covering the discovery of the remains of Schwerner, Chaney, and Goodman.

See also
 Civil rights movement in popular culture
 Neshoba (2010 documentary film)

External links

1990 television films
1990 films
American television films
1990s English-language films
1990 drama films
Films directed by Roger Young
Films set in the 1960s
Films set in Mississippi
Films about the Ku Klux Klan
Films about racism
Civil rights movement in television
The Wolper Organization films
NBC network original films